Mietków  is a village in Wrocław County, Lower Silesian Voivodeship, in south-western Poland. It is the seat of the administrative district (gmina) called Gmina Mietków.

References

Villages in Wrocław County